KBCK (1400 AM, "The River") was a radio station licensed to serve Deer Lodge, Montana. The station was last owned by Robert Cummings Toole. It last aired a Classic Country music format.

The station was assigned the KBCK call letters by the Federal Communications Commission on June 20, 2002.

Its license was surrendered to the FCC and cancelled on April 11, 2022 following the death of its owner; it had been off the air due to storm damage since August 2021.

Ownership
In November 2006, Butte Broadcasting reached an agreement with Jimmy Ray Carroll to acquire KBCK as part of a three-station deal worth a reported $500,000.

Robert Cummings Toole immediately reached an agreement to acquire KBCK from Butte Broadcasting for a reported cash price of $100,000.

References

External links
FCC Station Search Details: DKBCK (Facility ID: 670)
FCC History Cards for KBCK (covering 1961-1981 as KDRG)

BCK
Powell County, Montana
Radio stations established in 1964
Radio stations disestablished in 2022
1964 establishments in Montana
2022 disestablishments in Montana
Defunct radio stations in the United States
BCK